Thomas Duncan-Watt is an Australian screenwriter and playwright. He has won three AWGIE awards for his screenplays from five nominations. His work on UK series Dennis & Gnasher earned the series its first BAFTA nomination. In 2017, he was one of the mentors at the Arts/Screen Hackathon, along with Sarah Houbolt and others, which was organized by Australia Council for the Arts.

Career

TV writing 
Duncan-Watt began his career as a writer on Australian comedy series Good News Week. His series credits include Dennis & Gnasher, Pirate Express, Winston Steinburger & Sir Dudley Ding-Dong, Beat Bugs, Alien TV. In 2018, Duncan-Watt was brought on as one of the writers on sci-fi action series Space Nova, for which he also wrote the pilot. The series was subsequently nominated for two AWGIE awards, with Duncan-Watt winning the award for his episode Ghost Station. In 2019, Duncan-Watt, and collaborator, Suren Perera won Best in Show at the Asian Animation Summit in Seoul for their 'original concept', Escape from Pirate Asylum. Duncan-Watt and Perera were also the first international winners of the Ottawa Animation Festival’s ‘Pitch THIS’ competition, for their original series, Owl & Cloud.

Plays 
Duncan-Watt is the co-creator of two comedy plays, Thank You For Being a Friend and That Golden Girls Show: A Puppet Parody, both of which use Muppets-style puppets to parody the 1980s television series The Golden Girls. Thank You For Being a Friend toured Canada, where it won ‘Best Independent Theatre Production’ at the Broadway World Awards. That Golden Girls Show: A Puppet Parody debuted in 2016 Off-Broadway. The show commenced a US tour in 2019.

Thank You For Being a Friend lawsuit 
In 2016, Duncan-Watt, with the producers of the show Thank You For Being a Friend, Neil Gooding and Matthew Henderson, sued long-term collaborator Jonathan Rockefeller and his companies in New York state court over his puppet parody "That Golden Girls Show!";  alleged breaches of the license agreement, fraud, tortious interference with contract, defamation, other claims. The complaint by Duncan-Watt and his producers claimed that Rockefeller "stole the show"; deprived them of royalties; and harassed them. The suit was only partially dismissed in 2018 with presiding Judge Justice Andrea Masley allowing several complaints against Rockefeller to proceed.

In a separate case in Australia filed in 2017, Rockefeller and his company sued Duncan-Watt for defamation. In 2020, the Federal Court of Australia dismissed Rockefeller's defamation claims. In his ruling, Justice Thomas Thawley concluded that the Gooding's post was not defamatory because it was "substantially true" that Rockefeller had stolen the show from Duncan-Watt.

Awards and accolades

Citations

External links 
 
 Thomas Duncan-Watt at BroadwayWorld

Living people
Year of birth missing (living people)
Australian television writers
Australian comedy writers
Australian dramatists and playwrights
Australian male television writers